Siege of Aachen may refer to:

Siege of Aachen (1248), part of the crusade against Frederick II
Siege of Aachen (1614), part of the War of the Jülich Succession